Parry Hiram Moon (February 14, 1898 – March 4, 1988) was an American electrical engineer who, with Domina Eberle Spencer, co-wrote eight scientific books and over 200 papers on subjects including electromagnetic field theory, color harmony, nutrition, aesthetic measure and advanced mathematics. He also developed a theory of holors.

Biography
Moon was born in Beaver Dam, Wisconsin, to Ossian C. and Eleanor F. (Parry) Moon. He received a BSEE from University of Wisconsin in 1922 and an MSEE from MIT in 1924. Unfulfilled with his work in transformer design at Westinghouse, Moon obtained a position as research assistant at MIT under Vannevar Bush. He was hospitalized for six months after sustaining injuries from experimental work in the laboratory. He later continued his teaching and research as an associate professor in MIT's Electrical Engineering Department. He married Harriet Tiffany, with whom he had a son. In 1961, after the death of his first wife, he married his co-author, collaborator and former student, Domina Eberle Spencer, a professor of mathematics. They had one son. Moon retired from full-time teaching in the 1960s, but continued his research until his death in 1988.

Scientific contributions
Moon’s early career focused in optics applications for engineers. Collaborating with Spencer, he began researching electromagnetism and Amperian forces. The quantity of papers that followed culminated in Foundations of Electrodynamics, unique for its physical insights, and two field theory books, which became standard references for many years. Much later, Moon and Spencer unified the approach to collections of data (vectors, tensors, etc.), with a concept they coined "holors". Through their work, they became disillusioned with Albert Einstein's theory of relativity and sought neo-classical explanations for various phenomena.

Holors

Moon and Spencer invented the term "holor" (Greek ὅλος "whole") for a mathematical entity that is made up of one or more "independent quantities", or "merates" (Greek μέρος "part") as they are called in the theory of holors. With the definitions, properties and examples provided by Moon and Spencer, a holor is equivalent to an array of quantities, and any arbitrary array of quantities is a holor. (A holor with a single merate is equivalent to an array with one element.) The merates or component quantities themselves may be real or complex numbers or more complicated quantities such as matrices. For example, holors include particular representations of:
 real numbers, complex numbers, quaternions and other hypercomplex numbers;
 scalars, vectors and matrices;
 (geometric) scalars, (geometric) vectors, and tensors;
 non-tensorial geometric arrays of quantities such as the Levi-Civita symbol; and
 non-tensorial non-geometric arrays of quantities such as neural network (node and/or link) values or indexed inventory tables.
Note that Moon and Spencer's usage of the term "tensor" may be more precisely interpreted as "tensorial array", and so the subtitle of their work, Theory of Holors: A Generalization of Tensors, may be more precisely interpreted as "a generalization of tensorial arrays". To explain the usefulness of coining this term, Moon and Spencer wrote the following:

And, as indicated in the promotional blurb on the back of the book, part of the value of holors is the associated notational conventions and terminologies, which can provide a unified setting for a variety of mathematical objects, as well as a general setting that "opens up the possibility to devise a holor for a new ... application, without being limited to a few conventional types of holor".

Although the terminology relating to holors is not currently commonly found online, academic and technical books and papers that use this terminology can be found in literature searches (for instance, using Google Scholar). For example, books and papers on general dynamical systems, Fourier transforms in audio signal processing, and topology in computer graphics contain this terminology.

At a high level of abstraction, a holor can be considered as a whole – as a quantitative object without regard to whether it can be broken into parts or not. In some cases, it may be manipulated algebraically or transformed symbolically without needing to know about its inner components. At a lower level of abstraction, one can see or investigate how many independent parts the holor can be separated into, or if it can't be broken into pieces at all. The meaning of "independent" and "separable" may depend upon the context. Although the examples of holors given by Moon and Spencer are all discrete finite sets of merates (with additional mathematical structure), holors could conceivably include infinite sets, whether countable or not (again, with additional mathematical structure that provides meaning for "made up of" and "independent"). At this lower level of abstraction, a particular context for how the parts can be identified and labeled will yield a particular structure for the relationships of merates within and across holors, and different ways that the merates can be organized for display or storage (for example, in a computer data structure and memory system). Different kinds of holors can then be framed as different kinds of general data types or data structures.

Holors include arbitrary arrays. A holor is an array of quantities, possibly a single-element array or a multi-element array with one or more indices to label each element. The context of the usage of the holor will determine what sorts of labels are appropriate, how many indices there should be, and what values the indices will range over. The representing array could be jagged (with different dimensionality per index) or of uniform dimensionality across indices.  (An array with two or more indices is often called a "multidimensional array", referring to the dimensionality of the shape of the array rather than other degrees of freedom in the array. The term "multi-indexed" may be a less-ambiguous description. A multi-dimensional array is a holor, whether that refers to a single-indexed array of dimension two or greater, or a multi-element array with two or more indices.) A holor can thus be represented with a symbol and zero or more indices, such as —the symbol  with the two indices  and  shown in superscript.

In the theory of holors, the number of indices  used to label the merates is called the valence. This term is to remind one of the concept of chemical valence, indicating the "combining power" of a holor. (This "combining power" sense of valence is really only relevant in contexts where the holors can be combined, such as the case of tensor multiplication where indices pair up or "bond" to be summed-over.) The example holor above, has a valence of two. For valence equal to 0, 1, 2, 3, etc., a holor can be said to be nilvalent, univalent, bivalent, trivalent, etc., respectively. For each index , there is number of values  that the index may range over. That number  is called the plethos of that index, indicating the "dimensionality" related to that index. For a holor with uniform dimensionality over all of its indices, the holor itself can be said to have a plethos equal to the plethos of each index. (Both terms, valence and plethos, thus help to resolve some of the ambiguity of referring to the "dimension" of a holor, as well as resolving ambiguity with similar terminology in other mathematical contexts. No special term, however, is provided for the total number of merates, which is another sense of the "dimension" of a holor.)

If proper index conventions are maintained then certain relations of holor algebra are consistent with that of real algebra, i.e., addition and uncontracted multiplication are both commutative and associative. Moon and Spencer classify holors as either nongeometric objects or geometric objects. They further classify the geometric objects as either akinetors or oudors, where the (contravariant, univalent) akinetors transform as

 

and the oudors contain all other geometric objects (such as Christoffel symbols). The tensor is a special case of the akinetor where . Akinetors contain both tensors and pseudotensors in standard nomenclature.

Moon and Spencer also provide a novel classification of geometric figures in affine space with homogeneous coordinates. For example, a directed line segment that is free to slide along a given line is called a fixed rhabdor and corresponds to a sliding vector in standard nomenclature. Other objects in their classification scheme include free rhabdors, kineors, fixed strophors, free strophors, and helissors.

More can be said about the relationship between holors and tensors, and how holors may help clarify common confusion about tensors. A tensor is a mathematical object with particular properties, which can be represented as a (potentially multidimensional, multi-indexed) array of quantities—a tensorial array—if a basis for the related vector space is chosen for tensors of order greater than zero. A common misconception is that a tensor is simply a multidimensional array—a kind of generalization of vectors and matrices.  But this is not the case (at least in dominant mathematical and physics contexts), since a tensor, when represented as a multidimensional array, must obey certain transformation properties when changing basis vectors or coordinates.  So a tensorial array is an array, but an array is not necessarily a tensorial array. In particular, a tensorial array can be a multidimensional array, but a multidimensional array is not necessarily a tensorial array.  (This may more sloppily be said as "a tensor can be a multidimensional array, but a multidimensional array is not necessarily a tensor", where "tensor" here refers to a tensorial array.)

The mathematical term "holor" was coined in part to help clear up this confusion. Holors, as arbitrary arrays, include tensorial arrays as a special case. Holors can be said to be a generalization of tensorial arrays, in particular because the notation and terminology associated with holors provides a general setting for the algebra and calculus that tensorial arrays are involved in, including providing names and categories for technically non-tensorial objects that tensorial arrays interact with (such as the Levi-Civita symbol and the Christoffel symbols). When encountering the term "tensor" generally, it may sometimes be more accurate to substitute inequivalent terms such as "holor" or "arbitrary array" or "multidimensional array", depending on the context and potential misusage.

Bibliography

Books
 Parry Moon, The Scientific Basis of Illuminating Engineering, McGraw-Hill, 608pp. (1936) (ASIN B000J2QFAI).
 Parry Moon, Lighting Design, Addison-Wesley Press, 191pp. (1948) (ASIN B0007DZUFA).
 Parry Moon, A Proposed Musical Notation, (1952) (ASIN B0007JY81G).
 Parry Moon & Domina Eberle Spencer, Foundations of Electrodynamics, D. Van Nostrand Co., 314pp. (1960) (ASIN B000OET7UQ).
 Parry Moon & Domina Eberle Spencer, Field Theory for Engineers, D. Van Nostrand Co., 540pp. (1961).
 Parry Moon & Domina Eberle Spencer, Field Theory Handbook: Including Coordinate Systems, Differential Equations and Their Solutions, Spring Verlag, 236pp. (1961).
 Parry Moon & Domina Eberle Spencer, Vectors, D. Van Nostrand Co., 334pp. (1965) (ASIN B000OCMWTW).
 Parry Moon & Domina Eberle Spencer, Partial Differential Equations, D. C. Heath, 322pp. (1969) (ASIN B0006DXDVE).
 Parry Moon, The Abacus: Its History, Its Design, Its Possibilities in the Modern World, D. Gordon & Breach Science Pub., 179pp. (1971).
 Parry Moon & Domina Eberle Spencer, The Photic Field, MIT Press, 267pp. (1981).
 Parry Moon & Domina Eberle Spencer, Theory of Holors, Cambridge University Press, 392pp. (1986).

Papers

Notes

References

American electrical engineers
University of Wisconsin–Madison College of Engineering alumni
MIT School of Engineering alumni
MIT School of Engineering faculty
1898 births
1988 deaths
People from Beaver Dam, Wisconsin
20th-century American engineers